Dichomeris sciritis is a moth of the family Gelechiidae. It is found in Chennai, India.

The wingspan is about 11 mm. The forewings are brownish-ochreous, with the base of costal edge dark fuscous and with a white costal line from the base to the middle, thence continued around the margin of a fine elongate wedge-shaped dark fuscous mark lying along the costa beyond the middle, its acute end anterior. There is a small black whitish-edged apical dot. The hindwings are grey.

References

Moths described in 1918
sciritis
Moths of Asia